Indoplanorbis is a genus of air-breathing freshwater snail. Its only member species is Indoplanorbis exustus, an aquatic pulmonate gastropod mollusk in the family Planorbidae, the ram's horn snails. The species is widely distributed across the tropics. It serves as an important intermediate host for several trematode parasites. The invasive nature and ecological tolerance of Indoplanorbis exustus add to its importance in veterinary and medical science.

Taxonomy
Indoplanorbis exustus is the only known species in the genus Indoplanorbis. In spite of its long history and wide geographical range, it is thought that Indoplanorbis includes only a single species. However phylogeography research by Liu et al. (2010) revealed the phylogenetic depth of divergences between the Indian clades and Southeast Asian clades, together with habitat and parasitological differences suggest that Indoplanorbis exustus may comprise more than one species.

The most phylogenetically related genus to Indoplanorbis is genus Bulinus.

Distribution
The freshwater snail Indoplanorbis exustus is found across Iran, Nepal, India, Sri Lanka, Southeast Asia (for example Thailand), central Asia (Afghanistan), Arabia and Africa.

The type locality of Indoplanorbis exustus is marshes on the coast of Malabar in southwestern India.

Indoplanorbis exustus is a common snail across Southeast Asia and the Indian sub-continent. The snail is also found in the Middle East (Oman and Socotra) and Nigeria and the Ivory Coast; these findings were attributed by Brandt (1974) to recent introductions by human activities (Brandt's view has been frequently cited in the literature on Indoplanorbis). In contrast to Asia, the well documented appearance of the snail in Africa (e.g., Nigeria and Ivory Coast) and more recently (2002) in the Lesser Antilles, is almost certainly the result of introductions through human activities over the last 50–100 years.

This species is already established in the US, and is considered to represent a potentially serious threat as  a pest, an invasive species which could negatively affect agriculture, natural ecosystems, human health or commerce. Therefore, it has been suggested that this species be given top national quarantine significance in the US.

Biogeography 
Meier-Brook (1984) adopted an African (Gondwanan) origin for Indoplanorbis with rafting to Asia since the Cretaceous on the northward migrating Indian craton; this author also considered a Europe to Southwest Asia tract or an Africa to South India dispersal. Morgan et al. (2002) attributed the occurrence of Indoplanorbis in India to colonization (from Africa) via the Middle East land connection. Clearly the two different dispersal mechanisms imply very different chronologies; the Gondwanan vicariance hypothesis implies that proto-Indoplanorbis has been present in India since the late Eocene (35 Ma; India: Asia collision), whereas dispersal via
the Sinai-Levant suggests a Plio-Pleistocene arrival. The results by Liu et al. (2010) indicated a radiation beginning in the late Miocene with a divergence of an ancestral bulinine lineage into Assam and peninsular India clades. A Southeast Asian clade diverged from the peninsular India clade late-Pliocene; this clade then radiated at a much more rapid pace to colonize all of the sampled range of Indoplanorbis in the mid-Pleistocene.

Description 

The shell of this species, like all planorbids is sinistral in coiling, but is carried upside down and thus appears to be dextral. The shell of Indoplanorbis exustus is discoid with rapidly increasing whorls. Each whorl is higher than it is wide. The width of the shell is 5–25 mm. The height of the shell is 4.5–13 mm.

Planorbella duryi and Biomphalaria pfeifferi have similar shells.

Because of its wide distribution, various aspects of Indoplanorbis exustus have been studied, such as its calcium regulation and its hemocytes.

Ecology 
In captivity Indoplanorbis exustus can be reared on lettuce and spinach. Its diet is sometimes supplemented with sheep's liver and it can be given rat food to prepare for breeding.

Habitat 
The snail is found in small ponds, pools, and less commonly in rice paddy fields. The snail may also occur in semi-permanent pools formed in flooded areas of fields, where it can survive the dry season buried in mud. The desiccation tolerance of adult snails is high, while the resistance of juvenile snails is very low. Consequently, dispersal may occur in clumps of mud adhered to the bodies of cattle or across water in vegetation mats. It is possible it could be transported by birds.

Life cycle 
Indoplanorbis exustus is a hermaphroditic invasive snail species with high fecundity. Within one year of introduction the snail is able to colonize habitats with well established populations of other pulmonate and prosobranch snails. The snail requires a water temperature in excess of 15 °C for maturation. At the optimum temperature of 30 °C each snail can lay up to 800 eggs. There is from 2 to 43 eggs in one cluster with an average 20 eggs in one cluster. The capacity for self-fertilization and high fecundity probably underlies the invasive potential of the species. The average life span of Indoplanorbis exustus is 4 months and during this time it lays about 60 egg clusters.

Predators 
Eggs of Indoplanorbis exustus were experimentally predated and destroyed by Pomacea bridgesii. Raut & Aditya (2002) hypothetized that Pomacea bridgesii could be a potential biocontrol agent for Indoplanorbis exustus.

Parasites 
Indoplanorbis is of economic importance in that it is responsible for the transmission of several species of the genus Schistosoma which infect cattle and cause reduced livestock productivity. The snail is also of medical importance as a source of cercarial dermatitis among rural workers, particularly in India.

Indoplanorbis exustus is best known as the intermediate host responsible for the transmission of Schistosoma nasale and S. spindale, as well as other trematodes such as Echinostoma spp. and some spirorchids. A third species of Schistosoma, S. indicum (Montgomery, 1906), is also transmitted by I. exustus. Other snails have been implicated in transmission of these three Schistosoma species (such as Lymnaea luteola, a host for S. indicum and S. nasale, and L. acuminata, a host for S. nasale and S. spindale), I. exustus is the most important host for S. nasale and S. spindale, as well as for S. indicum in certain regions. I. exustus may be the sole natural intermediate host for these three Schistosoma species on the Indian sub-continent.

Indoplanorbis exustus is also an intermediate host for:
 Artyfechinostomum malayanum – as the first intermediate host
 Hypoderaeum conoideum – as the first intermediate host
 Fasciola gigantica
 Paramphistomum mehrai
 Paramphistomum explanatum
 Gastrodiscus secundus
 Petagifer srivastavi
 Plasmiorchis orientalis
 Pseudodiscus collinsi
 Gastrothylax crumenifer
 Enterohaemotrema paleorticum
 Cotylophoron cotylophorum
 Cotylophoron indica
 Cotylophoron bhaleraoi
 Cotylophoron mathurapurensis

Indoplanorbis exustus has been implicated in outbreaks of cercarial dermatitis in human populations in India, Laos, Malaysia and Thailand. Cercarial dermatitis results from the cutaneous allergic reaction in people exposed to larval schistosomes (cercariae) shed by infected snails into freshwater bodies such as lakes, ponds, and paddy fields. The cercariae cause pruritus (itching) and papular eruptions, with often severe secondary infections, as they attempt to infect a non-permissive definitive host and die in the skin.

Toxicology 
Aqueous extract of a common medicinal plant of India Euphorbia tithymaloides (Euphorbiaceae) has molluscicidal activity against Indoplanorbis exustus.

Ethanol extract of Solanum xanthocarpum has molluscicidal activity against Indoplanorbis exustus LC50 = 198.00 mg/L and LC90 = 236.80 mg/L.

The latex of Euphorbia milii has molluscicidal activity against Indoplanorbis exustus that depends on its hybrid of the plant.

The molluscicidal activity of latex of Cascabela thevetia, Alstonia scholaris and Euphorbia pulcherrima against Indoplanorbis exustus was examined by Singh & Sunil (2005).

Human use
It is a part of ornamental pet trade for freshwater aquaria.

References
This article incorporates CC-BY-2.0 text from the reference.

External links

 Baker F. C. (1945). The molluscan family Planorbidae. The University of Illinois Press, Urbana. 196-201.
 Raut S. K. (1986). "Disease transmitting snails. II. Population studies of Indoplanorbis exustus Deshayes." First year PRS Thesis in Science, University of Calcutta.
 
 .
 

Monotypic mollusc genera
Bulinidae